Sulfonamide hypersensitivity syndrome is similar to anticonvulsant hypersensitivity syndrome, but the onset is often sooner in the treatment course, generally after 7–14 days of therapy.

It is considered immune-mediated.

See also 
 List of cutaneous conditions

References

External links 

 

Drug eruptions
Syndromes